Neon is the third studio album by American country music artist Chris Young. It was released on July 12, 2011 via RCA Nashville. The album produced four singles with "Tomorrow", "You", the title track, and "I Can Take It from There". The album sold 72,830 copies its first week. Young co-wrote seven of the album's ten tracks.

Critical reception

AllMusic's Stephen Thomas Erlewine praised the album for being able to deliver tracks that straddle the line between country and country pop, and allows Young to perform them with convincing delivery, concluding that "If Neon does anything, it proves that Young can manage this delicate balance all the while seeming like it's no trouble at all." Jonathan Keefe of Slant Magazine was mixed towards the album, saying that despite some interesting tracks and Young's vocal delivery, it consists of filler that lacks a viewpoint and could've been performed by anyone, calling it "committee-based songwriting at its worst." He concluding that "It's a shame, then, that most of the set finds Young fighting an uphill battle against some lackluster material." In 2017, Billboard contributor Chuck Dauphin placed three tracks from the album on his top 10 list of Young's best songs: "Neon" at number three, "You" at number five and "Tomorrow" at number nine.

Track listing

Chart performance

Album

Weekly charts

Year end charts

Singles

Certifications

Personnel
Adapted from the Neon liner notes.
Musicians

 David Angell – violin
 Mike Brignardello – bass guitar
 David Davidson – violin
 Conni Ellisor – violin
 Shannon Forrest – drums
 Paul Franklin – dobro, steel guitar
 Kenny Greenberg – electric guitar
 Jim Grosjean – viola
 Aubrey Haynie – fiddle, mandolin
 Wes Hightower – background vocals
 Mark Hill – bass guitar
 Anthony LaMarchina – cello
 Betsy Lamb – viola
 Brent Mason – electric guitar
 Steve Nathan – organ, piano
 Mary K. Van Osdale – violin
 Carole Rabinowitz-Neuen – cello
 Pamela Sixfin – violin
 Alan Umstead – violin
 Catherine Umstead – violin
 Biff Watson – acoustic guitar
 Kristin Wilkinson – string arrangements, string conductor, viola
 Chris Young – lead vocals 

Production
 David Bryant – assistant
 Jake Burns – assistant
 Rich Hanson – assistant
 Julian King – engineer, mixing
 Bob Ludwig – mastering 
 Tammy Luker – production assistant
 Doug Rich – production assistant

References

2011 albums
Chris Young (musician) albums
RCA Records albums
Albums produced by James Stroud